Polyommatus andronicus is a butterfly in the family Lycaenidae. It is found in north-eastern Greece and south-western Bulgaria, where it inhabits the mountain ranges Slavyanka and southern Pirin.

Taxonomy
Some authors consider Polyommatus andronicus to be a separate species, while others treat it as a synonym of Polyommatus icarus.

References

Butterflies described in 1995
Polyommatus
Butterflies of Europe